Aehobak, also called Korean zucchini or Korean courgette, is an edible, green to yellow-green summer squash. Although nearly all summer squashes are varieties of Cucurbita pepo, aehobak belongs to the species Cucurbita moschata. Commonly used in Korean cuisine, an  has the shape of zucchini, but with thinner, smoother skin, and more delicate flesh. It is usually sold in shrink-wrapped plastic.

Cultivars of Korean zucchini include 'Seoulmadi', 'Bulam-sacheol', and 'Miso'.

Culinary use 
In Korean cuisine, the squash is used either fresh or dried. It is often made into - (seasoned vegetable side dish), usually seasoned with salted shrimps and stir-fried. Dried aehobak, called , can be prepared by slicing the squash thinly and sun-drying the slices.

See also 

 Oriental pickling melon
 Straightneck squash
 Tromboncino
 Zucchini

References 

Korean vegetables
Namul
Squashes and pumpkins